Andie MacDowell is an American actress. She made her film debut as Jane Porter in 1984's Greystoke: The Legend of Tarzan, Lord of the Apes. MacDowell received critical acclaim for her role in the 1989 independent drama Sex, Lies, and Videotape from Steven Soderbergh, for which she won Independent Spirit Award for Best Female Lead and was nominated for a Golden Globe Award for Best Actress – Motion Picture Drama. She would also receive Golden Globe Award nominations for her performances in Green Card (1990) and Four Weddings and a Funeral (1994).

Other notable performances from MacDowell include St. Elmo's Fire (1985), Groundhog Day (1993), Short Cuts (1993), Michael (1996), Multiplicity (1996), Footloose (2011), and Magic Mike XXL (2015). She received critical acclaim for the 2017 drama film Love After Love, and starred in the film Ready or Not (2019). In television, MacDowell started in the Hallmark Channel romance series Cedar Cove, which ran from 2013 to 2015.

Filmography

Film

Television

References

External links
 Andie MacDowell at the Internet Movie Database

Actress filmographies
American filmographies